Aleksandr Aleksandrovich Kirichenko (born 13 August 1967) is a Ukrainian track cyclist. He won the gold medal in the 1 km time trial at the 1988 Summer Olympics, competing for the Soviet Union.

References

External links
 

1967 births
Living people
Ukrainian male cyclists
Cyclists at the 1988 Summer Olympics
Cyclists at the 1992 Summer Olympics
Cyclists at the 1996 Summer Olympics
Olympic cyclists of the Soviet Union
Olympic cyclists of the Unified Team
Olympic cyclists of Russia
Olympic gold medalists for the Soviet Union
Olympic medalists in cycling
Sportspeople from Kyiv
Medalists at the 1988 Summer Olympics
Ukrainian track cyclists